Rosalia coelestis is a species of beetle in the family Cerambycidae. It was described by Semenov in 1911.

References

Compsocerini
Beetles described in 1911